Henry Washington Younger (February 22, 1810 – July 20, 1862) was a businessman and father to the Younger outlaws Cole, Jim, John and Bob. He was the father of fourteen children.  He was the son of Colonel Charles Lee Younger and Sarah Sullivan Purcell and married Bersheba Leighton Fristoe in about 1830.

Henry and Bersheba Younger's Children
Laura Helen Younger (born 1 January 1832)
Frances Isabelle Younger (born March 1833)
Martha Ann (Annie) Younger (born 9 January 1835)
Charles Richard (Dick) Younger (born about 1838, died 17 August 1860)
Mary Josephine Younger (born about 1840)
Caroline (Duck) Younger (born about 1842)
Thomas Coleman (Cole) Younger (born 15 January 1844)
Sarah Ann (Sally) Younger (born 2 September 1846)
James Hardin (Jim) Younger (born 15 January 1848)
Alphae Younger (born about 1850, died about 1852)
John Harrison Younger (born about 1851)
Emily J. Younger (born about 1852)
Robert Ewing (Bob) Younger (born 29 October 1853)
Henrietta (Retta) Younger (born 9 January 1857)

Family life and death
The family moved to Harrisonville in 1857, and in 1859 Henry was assigned as second mayor of the city.

He was frequently robbed and lost a lot of money.  This angered his son Cole who thought he should make a stand. On July 20, 1862 Henry was traveling to Kansas City on a business trip while carrying $1,500 on his person. About one mile south of Westport he was shot three times in the back and killed. It was discovered the killing was politically motivated and not a robbery.

The body was returned to the Youngers who, afraid Union servicemen would dig it up, buried him in an unknown grave.

References

External links
Younger family genealogy on the official website for the Family of Jesse James: Stray Leaves, A James Family in America Since 1650

1810 births
1862 deaths
People from Harrisonville, Missouri
James–Younger Gang
Bleeding Kansas
Mayors of places in Missouri
Deaths by firearm in Missouri
Assassinated American people
People murdered in Missouri